Ice hockey at the 2017 European Youth Olympic Winter Festival was a men's under-18 ice hockey tournament played during the Erzurum 2017 edition of the European Youth Olympic Festival (EYOF). It was held at the Erzurum GSIM Ice Arena in Erzurum, Turkey from 13 to 17 February 2017. Five countries participated in the tournament.

Group stage
All times are local (UTC+3).

Group A

Group B

Knockout stage

Semifinals

Bronze medal game

Final

References
 
 

European Youth Olympics
2017
2017 European Youth Olympics
2017 European Youth Olympic Winter Festival events
European Youth Olympic Winter Festival